Griffith Creek is an unincorporated community in Summers County, West Virginia, United States. Griffith Creek is located along the Greenbrier River and West Virginia routes 3 and 12, west of Alderson.

History
Griffith Creek was named for an early settler who had been abducted as a child by Indians, and whose father had been killed by Indians.

References

Unincorporated communities in Summers County, West Virginia
Unincorporated communities in West Virginia